One Chicago (formerly One Chicago Square) is the River North neighborhood of Chicago. Developed the towers, and Goettsch Partners and Hartshorne Plunkard Architecture provided designs.

History and development
The building's site previously held a parking lot owned by the Catholic Archdiocese of Chicago. The Archdiocese began seeking a development partner to build a structure on the site through real estate-focused investment bank Eastdil in 2016. The development was approved by the Chicago Plan Commission in 2018. The building topped out in 2021.

In April 2019, the developer JDL announced that the project name was changed from "One Chicago Square" to "One Chicago" to better connect the property to its address of 1 West Chicago Avenue.

On April 14, 2022, a large piece of glass fell from One Chicago due to high winds. The glass narrowly missed a pedestrian walking near the intersection of State and Superior.

Design
Goettsch Partners and Hartshorne Plunkard Architecture designed the buildings. The complex will contain two towers connected by a central podium. When completed, the taller of the two towers will be the eighth-tallest structure in Chicago with an anticipated 78 stories, although a final height has not been determined and a spire may be added to the design.

Usage
The project is a mixed-use development, though primarily residential, with 812 residential units.

Planned retail tenants for the podium of the two towers include a Whole Foods Market and Life Time luxury athletic resort, as well as an upscale restaurant and an event center catered toward receptions for weddings at Holy Name Cathedral.

See also

 List of tallest buildings in Chicago

References

Proposed buildings and structures in Illinois
Proposed skyscrapers in the United States
Residential skyscrapers in Chicago
Residential condominiums in Chicago